The Fallbridge Subdivision is a railway line in southern Washington running about  along the Columbia River from Pasco to Vancouver, then south to Portland, OR. It is operated by BNSF Railway and is considered part of the Northern Transcon.

The Portland section of Amtrak's Empire Builder, Trains 27 and 28, utilize this line servicing stops in Wishram, WA; Bingen, WA; Vancouver, WA; and Portland, OR.

References

External links
BNSF Subdivisions

BNSF Railway lines
Rail infrastructure in Washington (state)